The Christmas Chronicles is a 2018 American Christmas comedy film directed by Clay Kaytis from a screenplay by Matt Lieberman. The film stars Kurt Russell, Judah Lewis, Darby Camp, Lamorne Morris, Kimberly Williams-Paisley, and Oliver Hudson. It is the first installment in The Christmas Chronicles film series. The film was produced by 1492 Pictures and Wonder Worldwide and was released on November 22, 2018, on Netflix.

The plot follows two children, Kate and Teddy, who notice Santa Claus in their home and jump into his sleigh with his reindeer; however, they accidentally cause the sleigh to crash, and the presents are lost. As Christmas morning approaches, it is up to the children and Santa to save Christmas by correctly delivering all of the presents.

The Christmas Chronicles received mixed-to-positive reviews from critics. A sequel, titled The Christmas Chronicles 2, was released on November 25, 2020, with much of the original cast returning.

Plot
In Lowell, Massachusetts around Christmas 2018, widowed mother Claire Pierce struggles to keep her family together after they had a fight because of the death of her firefighter husband Doug, who died while trying to save some strangers from a fire. Claire's son Teddy has lost his Christmas spirit and becomes involved in illegal activities like stealing cars. However, Teddy's younger sister, Kate, is trying to keep the Christmas spirit alive, while maintaining a belief in Santa Claus. Kate catches Teddy stealing a car from a parking lot and records it, threatening to show Claire, but changes her mind, telling Claire that Teddy had smashed a picture frame instead.

On Christmas Eve, Claire is called away to fill in for a coworker, leaving Teddy to look after Kate. While watching old family Christmas videos, Kate notices a strange arm appear out of the fireplace. Kate believes this is Santa and convinces Teddy to help her by promising to destroy the tape of Teddy stealing the car. The two set up a makeshift tripwire and a hidden camera. Kate is later woken up and sees Santa in the living room. However, he escapes to the roof and the two children follow. Kate decides to hide in his sleigh to get a closer look, and Teddy reluctantly follows her. Santa rides off with the kids in tow. When Kate decides to make her presence known, Santa and the reindeer are startled and he loses control of the sleigh. After teleporting to Chicago, Illinois, the sleigh breaks down, causing the reindeer to scatter and Santa's hat and a bag of presents to be lost.

Santa introduces himself to the kids and tells them that he has to get back to delivering presents as soon as possible or else Christmas spirit will be lost. Without his hat, Santa cannot move quickly or through tight spaces like he normally does. The kids are forced to help him after he threatens to put them on the naughty list permanently. They stop at a bar where Santa tries to seek help from the patrons. When they get no assistance, they steal a car at Teddy's suggestion, after he reminds Santa that the car was already stolen by the bartender and they can turn it into the police afterwards. They locate the reindeer, but encounter a police car driven by police officers Dave Poveda and Mikey Jameson, who are looking for the stolen car. Kate goes after the reindeer by herself while Teddy and Santa lure the police away. Santa is arrested, while Kate and Teddy escape with the reindeer. The kids find Santa's bag, and Kate goes inside to find help. She is teleported to the North Pole where she encounters Santa's elves, who agree to help her.

Meanwhile, Teddy is attacked by Vincent and his gang of thugs who take him and the bag to their hideout, where he is saved by Kate and the elves, who then set out to repair Santa's sleigh. At the police station, Santa tries to explain his situation to Officer Poveda. When Santa reveals that the officer's wish this year is to reconcile with his ex-wife, Lisa, who also shares that wish, Poveda is taken aback, but still refuses to believe him. Poveda has Santa locked in the holding cell, though he becomes suspicious when he sees a larger number of arrests than usual on Christmas Eve. Seeing that Christmas spirit has gotten too low, Santa gathers all the inmates to perform "Santa Claus Is Back in Town", which works among all the officers except Poveda. Poveda is finally convinced when he receives a call from Lisa, who invites him out for coffee in the morning, and agrees to let Santa go. One of the elves arrives through the air vent to give Santa a spare hat. Santa goes outside to find his sleigh repaired.

Santa sees that he only has an hour until morning to complete delivering presents, so the kids agree to help him. With Kate tossing him presents and Teddy driving the sleigh, Santa is able to deliver all of the presents, saving Christmas. Afterwards, he drops the kids off back at their home before their mother returns. The siblings ask Santa if they’ll ever see him again, and Santa says not if he can help it but will if he ever needs help in future. Santa gives Teddy his hat as a memento, showing that he did not really need it. 

When Claire returns, they go inside to find that the living room has been decorated like their father used to do it. When the kids open their gifts from Santa on Christmas morning, Kate gets the skateboard she asked for, while Teddy gets a magic ornament. When Teddy hangs it on the tree, he sees his dad magically appear in his reflection, and they both express pride in each other.

Back in the North Pole, Santa reunites with Mrs. Claus, who has come home. She asks what movie they are going to watch, and Santa takes out the video Kate took of the entire  adventure with a smile.

Cast

 Kurt Russell as Santa Claus / Saint Nick, a magical figure who brings presents for people on Christmas night, when they are asleep.
 Darby Camp as Kate Pierce, an enthusiastic 11-year-old girl who is Teddy's younger sister. Kate has faith in Santa and decides to find Santa's sleigh on Christmas Eve.
 Kaitlin Aidree as 3 to 5-year old Kate Pierce.
 Judah Lewis as Teddy Pierce, a 16-year-old boy and Kate's older brother. He does not believe in Santa Claus, and engages in illegal activities after the death of his father.
 Jesse Gervasi as 3-year-old Teddy Pierce.
 David Kohlsmith as 5-year-old Teddy Pierce.
 Jack Bona as 8 to 10-year-old Teddy Pierce.
 Lamorne Morris as Officer Mikey Jameson, a police officer who lives in Chicago, Illinois.
 Kimberly Williams-Paisley as Claire Pierce, Teddy's and Kate's widowed mother. She is a nurse at a hospital in Lowell, Massachusetts.
 Oliver Hudson as Doug Pierce, Teddy and Kate's late father and Claire's husband. He was a firefighter and died after running into a fire to save several random people.
 Martin Roach as Officer Dave Poveda, a police officer who lives in Chicago, Illinois who does not remember Santa Claus.
 Vella Lovell as Wendy, a hostess at a restaurant and aspiring fashion designer.
 Tony Nappo as Bartender Charlie Plummer, an ex-con bartender.
 Steven van Zandt as Wolfie, an inmate who formerly wanted to be a musician.
 Marc Ribler as Dusty, another inmate who also formerly wanted to be a musician.
 Jeff Teravainen as Vincent, a villain
 Goldie Hawn as Mrs Claus, the wife of Santa Claus.
 Gaten Matarazzo as Dustin Henderson on the tablet of the valet worker.

Voices
 Debra Wilson as Lars
 Kari Wahlgren as Jojo
 Andrew Morgado as Hugg
 Debi Derryberry as Fleck
 Michael Yurchak as Bjorn
 Jessica Lowe as Mina

Production
Development for what would become The Christmas Chronicles began in June 2013, when it was announced Chris Columbus' 1492 Pictures had acquired a Found Footage spec script titled 12/24 written by Matt Lieberman and based on a story by Lieberman and David Guggenheim wherein two brothers set out to prove that Santa Claus is real, using their home video camera and inadvertently cause Santa’s sleigh to crash after stowing away with the brothers trying to work together to save Christmas. 

In December 2017, it was reported that Kurt Russell would star as Santa Claus in the film for Netflix, later given the title The Christmas Chronicles.

Principal photography began in January 2018 in Toronto, Ontario. The film was set in Lowell, Massachusetts, and Chicago, Illinois.

Release
The film was released on November 22, 2018.

Netflix reported the film was streamed by 20 million households over its first week of release.

Reception
The website's critical consensus reads, "Viewers seeking a fresh holiday viewing option – or those simply in the mood for Santa Kurt Russell – should find The Christmas Chronicles well worth a yuletide stream." On Metacritic, the film has a weighted average score of 52 out of 100, based on 10 critics, indicating "mixed or average reviews".

Melanie McFarland of Salon said: "The film's no great shakes, but Russell's star power in 'The Christmas Chronicles' is a gift anyone should be happy to claim." Charles Bramesco of The A.V. Club wrote: "The film doesn't know how to get out of its own way and foreground what's working, namely the dynamo of screen presence placed more prominently in the advertising than the feature itself." Writing for Vox Magazine, Jenna Allen said: "Above all, it’s clear that Netflix has subverted the holiday movie blueprint – Hallmark, I'm looking at you – by giving us novelty, thrill and humor." Derek Smith of Slant Magazine wrote: "In the end, the film succumbs to the tropes and emotional contrivances of the family melodrama at its core, ending up as a serviceable yet mostly forgettable addition to the already overstuffed genre of holiday-themed films."

Soundtrack 
The film features a cover of Elvis Presley's Santa Claus Is Back in Town, performed by Little Steven and the Disciples of Soul, with actor Kurt Russell on lead vocals. The lineup includes Stevie Van Zandt (of Springsteen's E Street Band) and Marc Ribler on guitar. The band recorded the song with Russell at Steven's studio in New York. In the film, the song is performed by Santa Claus (Kurt Russell) during a scene set at the jailhouse. Each of the band  appear onscreen, including Van Zandt and Ribler as named characters Wolfie and Dusty.

Sequel

On September 15, 2020, a sequel titled The Christmas Chronicles 2 was announced. Original director Clay Kaytis dropped out and was replaced by Chris Columbus, who produced the first installment. Stars Kurt Russell, Goldie Hawn, Darby Camp, Kimberly Williams-Paisley and Judah Lewis were all confirmed to reprise their roles, while Julian Dennison and Jahzir Bruno were cast to appear in the sequel. The Christmas Chronicles 2 was released on Netflix on November 25, 2020.

See also
 List of Christmas films
 Santa Claus in film

References

External links
 

1492 Pictures films
2010s adventure comedy films
2010s American films
2010s Christmas comedy films
2018 comedy films
2010s English-language films
2018 films
American adventure comedy films
American Christmas comedy films
Christmas adventure films
English-language Netflix original films
Films directed by Clay Kaytis
Films produced by Chris Columbus
Films scored by Christophe Beck
Films set in Massachusetts
Films set in Chicago
Films shot in Chicago
Films set in 2018
Films with screenplays by Matt Lieberman
Santa Claus in film